Scotland Yard is a British crime television series which aired on the BBC in 1960. Each episode was a dramatised documentary of a real-life case tackled by Scotland Yard. It should not be confused with the contemporary film series of the same title, which was made between 1953-1961.

Actors who appeared in episodes of the show include Glyn Houston, Lee Montague, David Lyn, Nigel Stock, Lloyd Lamble, Norman Mitchell, John Barrie, Brian Wilde, Michael Robbins, Frederick Piper, Geoffrey Chater, Patrick Newell, Roddy Hughes, Anthony Sagar, Mary Hignett, Martin Boddey, Bryan Pringle, Peter Cellier, Patrick Cargill, Jill Bennett, Rita Webb, Vanda Godsell, Marianne Stone, and Michael Ripper.

References

Bibliography
 Cooke, Lez. Troy Kennedy Martin. Manchester University Press, 2007.

External links
 

BBC television dramas
1960 British television series debuts
1960 British television series endings
English-language television shows